A reflex radio receiver, occasionally called a reflectional receiver, is a radio receiver design in which the same amplifier is used to amplify the high-frequency radio signal (RF) and low-frequency audio (sound) signal (AF).  It was first invented in 1914 by German scientists Wilhelm Schloemilch and Otto von Bronk, and rediscovered and extended to multiple tubes in 1917 by Marius Latour and William H. Priess.  The radio signal from the antenna and tuned circuit passes through an amplifier, is demodulated in a detector which extracts the audio signal from the radio carrier, and the resulting audio signal passes again through the same amplifier for audio amplification before being applied to the earphone or loudspeaker.  The reason for using the amplifier for "double duty" was to reduce the number of active devices, vacuum tubes or transistors, required in the circuit, to reduce the cost.  The economical reflex circuit was used in inexpensive vacuum tube radios in the 1920s, and was revived again in simple portable tube radios in the 1930s.

How it works

The block diagram shows the general form of a simple reflex receiver.  The receiver functions as a tuned radio frequency (TRF) receiver.  The radio frequency (RF) signal from the tuned circuit (bandpass filter) is amplified, then passes through the high pass filter to the demodulator, which extracts the audio frequency (AF) (modulation) signal from the carrier wave.  The audio signal is added back into the input of the amplifier, and is amplified again.  At the output of the amplifier the audio is separated from the RF signal by the low pass filter and is applied to the earphone.  The amplifier could be a single stage or multiple stages. It can be seen that since each active device (tube or transistor) is used to amplify the signal twice,  the reflex circuit is equivalent to an ordinary receiver with double the number of active devices. 

The reflex receiver should not be confused with a regenerative receiver, in which the same signal is fed back from the output of the amplifier to its input.  In the reflex circuit it is only the audio extracted by the demodulator which is added to the amplifier input, so there are two separate signals at different frequencies passing through the amplifier at the same time.

The reason the two signals, the RF and AF currents, can pass simultaneously through the amplifier without interfering is due to the superposition principle because the amplifier is linear.  Since the two signals have different frequencies, they can be separated at the output with frequency selective filters.   Therefore the proper functioning of the circuit depends on the amplifier operating in the linear region of its transfer curve.   If the amplifier is significantly nonlinear, intermodulation distortion will occur and the audio signal will modulate the RF signal, resulting in audio feedback which can cause a shrieking in the earphone.  The presence of the audio return circuit from the amplifier output to input made the reflex circuit vulnerable to such parasitic oscillation problems.

Applications 
The most common application of the reflex circuit in the 1920s was in inexpensive single tube receivers, because many consumers could not afford more than one vacuum tube, and the reflex circuit got the most out of a single tube, it was equivalent to a two-tube set.  During this period the demodulator was usually a carborundum point contact diode, but sometimes a vacuum tube grid-leak detector.  However multitube receivers like the TRF and superheterodyne were also made with some of their amplifier stages "reflexed".

The reflex principle was used in compact superheterodyne radio receivers from the 1930s to the early 1950s; the intermediate frequency amplifier stage was also the first audio frequency stage using a reflex arrangement. That arrangement provided similar performance, in a four-tube radio, as one with five tubes. At least one type of tube was specially designed for this kind of receiver design. Low cost mains-powered radios that used a reflex TRF design, with only three tubes, were still being mass produced in the late 1940s.

Example

The diagram (right) shows one of the most common single tube reflex circuits from the early 1920s.  It functioned as a TRF receiver with one stage of RF and one stage of audio amplification.  The radio frequency (RF) signal from the antenna passes through the bandpass filter C1, L1, L2, C2 and is applied to the grid of the directly heated triode, V1.   The capacitor C6 bypasses the RF signal around the audio transformer winding T2 which would block it.   The amplified signal from the plate of the tube is applied to the RF transformer L3, L4 while C3 bypasses the RF signal around the headphone coils.  The tuned secondary L4, C5 which is tuned to the input frequency, serves as a second bandpass filter as well as blocking the audio signal in the plate circuit from getting to the detector.  Its output is rectified by semiconductor diode D, which was a carborundum point contact type.  

The resulting audio signal extracted by the diode from the RF signal is coupled back into the grid circuit by audio transformer T1, T2 whose iron core serves as a choke to help prevent RF from getting back into the grid circuit and causing feedback.  The capacitor C4 provides more protection against feedback, blocking the pulses of RF from the diode, but is usually not needed since the transformer's winding T1 normally has enough parasitic capacitance.   The audio signal is applied to the grid of the tube and amplified.  The amplified audio signal from the plate passes easily through the low inductance RF primary winding L3 and is applied to the earphones T.  The rheostat R1 controlled the filament current, and in these early sets was used as a volume control.

References

External links

Schematic of FADA model 160 neutrodyne radio, a reflectional receiver from the 1920s.
Schematic of General Electric model F40 radio, a Super-Heterodyne receiver first manufactured in 1937.

Receiver (radio)
Radio electronics